Walter "Fuzzy" Kofler (born 6 June 1948) is an Italian rally driver, four-time winner of the FIA E-Rally Regularity Cup.

Career 
As a rally driver, in 2012, Kofler began to participate in tenders reserved for electrically powered vehicles thanks to the partnership with the Autotest Motorsport team of Josef Unterholzner.

In the 2014 season he won the FIA Alternative Energies Cup in a Think City, paired with co-driver Franco Gaioni. He repeated this 2015, while in 2017, in a Tesla Model S, he won the world title in the FIA E-Rally Regularity Cup, then also won in 2019 in an Audi e-tron.

References

1948 births
Living people
People from Tscherms
FIA E-Rally Regularity Cup drivers
Italian rally drivers
Sportspeople from Südtirol